Brian Wells (born September 23, 1970) is an American retired competitive pair skater. He had the most success with partner Shelby Lyons, with whom he won four medals at the United States Figure Skating Championships, and competed with twice at the World Figure Skating Championships, placing 10th in 1996 and in 1998. Their partnership ended in 1998.

Wells had previously competed with Laura Murphy, with whom he won the gold at the 1990 United States Collegiate Championships. Before that, he had competed with sister Ann-Marie Wells on the Junior level and at the 1988 and 1989 World Junior Figure Skating Championships.

Following his skating days, Wells went back to college, eventually attending Tufts University and becoming a dentist.

Results
(with Shelby Lyons)

References

 Pairs on Ice: Lyons & Wells
 Pairs on Ice: Murphy & Wells
 Pairs on Ice: Wells & Wells

1970 births
Living people
American male pair skaters
Harvard School of Dental Medicine alumni
20th-century American people
21st-century American people